Camelot is a historic home located at State College, Centre County, Pennsylvania. It was built starting in 1922, and is a two-story rambling frame dwelling, covered with stucco and dressed in limestone.  It features a roof that consists of a series of five main interconnecting gables with gable overhang.  The house has a whimsical character and its setting suggests a scene from the English countryside.

It was added to the National Register of Historic Places in 1979.

References

Houses on the National Register of Historic Places in Pennsylvania
Houses completed in 1922
Houses in Centre County, Pennsylvania
National Register of Historic Places in Centre County, Pennsylvania